Kagua Rural LLG is a local-level government (LLG) of Southern Highlands Province, Papua New Guinea.

Wards
01. Alopea
02. Aboma
03. Kagua Station
04. Karia (Aliya)
05. Katiloma
06. Kira
07. Koalilombo
08. Andari
09. Mapuanda
10. Marili
11. Mendo
12. Mungaro
13. Pawabi
14. Porane
15. Raku
16. Rogoma
17. Rongka
18. Rumbalere
19. Sumbura
20. Wakiapanda
21. Tulire
22. Yalu
23. Yango
24. Yame
45. Alenda

References

Local-level governments of Southern Highlands Province